Aurora State Airport  is a public airport located one mile (2 km) northwest of the central business district of Aurora, a city in Marion County, Oregon, United States. It is owned by the Oregon Department of Aviation.

Although most U.S. airports use the same three-letter location identifier for the FAA and IATA, Aurora State Airport is assigned UAO by the FAA but has no designation from the IATA.

Primarily a general aviation airport, Aurora has significant business aviation based at the field.  In addition the airport serves as the home to two major aviation companies Van's Aircraft and Columbia Helicopters.

On May 26, 2009, the Oregon State Legislature passed a resolution identifying the airport as Wes Lematta Field at Aurora State Airport.  The late Wes Lematta was the founder of Columbia Helicopters located on the northeastern corner of the field.

Facilities and aircraft
For the 12-month period ending June 30, 2000, the airport had 73,895 aircraft operations, an average of 202 per day: 91% general aviation, 8% air taxi and <1% military. There are 432 aircraft based at this airport: 84% single engine, 7% multi-engine, 1% jet aircraft and 8% helicopters.

Three fixed-base operators operate at the field: Aurora Aviation, Lynx FBO Network, and Willamette Aviation.  Aurora Aviation and Willamette Aviation provide aircraft fuel services, flight instruction, aircraft rentals, and aircraft sales, while Lynx FBO Network primarily provides aircraft refueling services, hangars for corporate aircraft, and an executive lounge for private and corporate jet operations.

Due to increased flight activity and its location in the busy airspace corridor between Salem McNary Field and Portland International Airport, an air traffic control (ATC) tower was constructed at the Aurora State Airport. As of late 2015 construction of the control tower was complete and the tower became operational. In addition, the airspace class designation at UAO was changed to "Class D" airspace.

Adjacent to the airport are the Columbia Aviation Heliport and Columbia Helicopters Heliport.

Airlines and destinations

History
The airport was built by the United States Army Air Forces in 1943, and was known as Aurora Flight Strip.  It was an outlying (supporting)  airfield to Portland Army Air Base for military aircraft on training flights.    It was closed after World War II, and was turned over for state government use by the War Assets Administration (WAA).

See also

 Oregon World War II Army Airfields

References

 Shaw, Frederick J. (2004), Locating Air Force Base Sites History's Legacy, Air Force History and Museums Program, United States Air Force, Washington DC, 2004.

External links

 Airport Master Plan
 Aurora Jet Center website
 Aurora Aviation website
 Willamette Aviation website
 Southend Airpark website

Airports in Marion County, Oregon
Aurora, Oregon
Flight Strips of the United States Army Air Forces
Airfields of the United States Army Air Forces in Oregon
1943 establishments in Oregon